"Take My Hand, Precious Lord" (a.k.a. "Precious Lord, Take My Hand") is a gospel song. The lyrics were written by Thomas A. Dorsey, who also adapted the melody.

Origin
The melody is credited to Dorsey, drawn extensively from the 1844 hymn tune, "Maitland". "Maitland" is often attributed to American composer George N. Allen (1812–1877), but the earliest known source (Plymouth Collection, 1855) shows that Allen was the author/adapter of the text "Must Jesus bear the cross alone," not the composer of the tune, and the tune itself was printed without attribution for many years. "Maitland" is also sometimes attributed to The Oberlin Social and Sabbath School Hymn Book, which Allen edited, but this collection does not contain music. This tune originally appeared in hymnals and tune books as "Cross and Crown"; the name "Maitland" appears as early as 1868. Dorsey said that he had heard Blind Connie Williams sing his version of this song with "Precious Lord" and used it as inspiration. Dorsey wrote "Precious Lord" in response to his inconsolable bereavement at the death of his wife, Nettie Harper, in childbirth, and his infant son in August 1932. (Mr. Dorsey can be seen telling this story in the 1982 gospel music documentary Say Amen, Somebody.) The earliest known recording was made on February 16, 1937, by the Heavenly Gospel Singers  (Bluebird B6846). "Take My Hand, Precious Lord" was first published in 1938. "Take My Hand, Precious Lord" is published in more than 40 languages.

Performances
It was Martin Luther King Jr.'s favorite song, and he often invited gospel singer Mahalia Jackson to sing it at civil rights rallies to inspire crowds; at his request she sang it at his funeral in April 1968. King's last words before his assassination was a request for musician Ben Branch to play it at a service he was due to attend that night. King's exact last words were "Ben, make sure you play 'Take My Hand, Precious Lord' in the meeting tonight. Play it real pretty." Opera singer Leontyne Price sang it at the state funeral of President Lyndon B. Johnson in January 1973, and Aretha Franklin sang it at Mahalia Jackson's funeral in 1972. Franklin also recorded a live version of the song for her album Amazing Grace (1972) as a medley with "You've Got a Friend". It was sung by Nina Simone at the Westbury Music Fair on April 7, 1968, three days after King's assassination. That evening was dedicated to him and recorded on the album 'Nuff Said!. It was also performed by Ledisi in the movie and soundtrack for Selma in which Ledisi portrays Mahalia Jackson. It was also performed by Beyoncé at the 57th Annual Grammy Awards on February 8, 2015. Dave Grohl recited the lyrics of the song at a remembrance service for his friend, Lemmy from Motörhead, in January 2016.

Recordings
Many notable musicians have recorded "Take My Hand, Precious Lord". It was recorded by Mahalia Jackson on Tuesday March 27, 1956, on the album Bless This House (Columbia Records CL 899) with The Fall-Jones Ensemble: Mildred Falls (piano), Ralph Jones (organ).

1938: Selah Jubilee Singers (Decca 7598)
1939: The Soul Stirrers (Down Beat 103)
1941: Sister Rosetta Tharpe (Decca 8610) 
1954: The Blind Boys Of Alabama on Oh Lord, Stand By Me (Speciality)
1954: Little Jimmy Dickens on Old Country Church (Columbia)
1956: Mahalia Jackson on Bless This House (Columbia)
1956: Aretha Franklin on Songs of Faith 
1957: Elvis Presley on Elvis' Christmas Album (RCA Victor)
1961: Blind Connie Williams
1982: Al Green on Precious Lord (Grammy winner)
2014: Ledisi from Selma
2017: Dee Dee Bridgewater on Memphis... Yes, I'm Ready
2019: Kimbra on Offering, 2019 charity album

Accolades
"Take My Hand, Precious Lord" was inducted into the Christian Music Hall of Fame in 2007. It was also included in the list of Songs of the Century, by the Recording Industry Association of America and the National Endowment for the Arts. In 2012, Mahalia Jackson's recording of "Precious Lord, Take My Hand" was honored with the Grammy Hall of Fame Award.

References

External links
 Mahalia Jackson 1961 television performance
 Aretha Franklin 1984 performance

1937 songs
1937 singles
Songs written by Thomas A. Dorsey
Nina Simone songs
Aretha Franklin songs
Gospel songs
Mahalia Jackson songs
Ike & Tina Turner songs
American Christian hymns
Assassination of Martin Luther King Jr.